Echanella hirsutipennis is a species of moth of the family Erebidae first described by Robinson in 1975. It is endemic to Fiji.

References

External links
"Echanella hirsutipennis". Moths in Fiji. Archived July 26, 2011. Image.

Herminiinae